Pikine Department is one of the 45 departments of Senegal and one of the four which make up Dakar Region. Its capital is Pikine.

The department is divided into 3 arrondissements, each subdivided into communes de arrondissement:
Dagoudane Arrondissement:
 Dalifort
 Djidah Thiaroye Kaw
 Guinaw Rail Nord
 Guinaw Rail Sud
 Pikine Est
 Pikine Nord
 Pikine Ouest
Niayes Arrondissement:
 Keur Massar
 Malika
 Yeumbeul Nord
 Yeumbeul Sud
Thiaroye Arrondissement
 Diamaguène Sicap Mbao 	
 Thiaroye-Gare
 Thiaroye-sur-Mer
 Thiaroye-Diaksao
 Thiaroye-Mbao

Population
In the census of 2002 the population of the department was recorded at 768,826. In 2005 it was estimated at 834,246.
 
Historic sites 
 Military Cemetery at Thiaroye

References

Departments of Senegal
Dakar Region